The Best in Town is the second album to by Welsh post-hardcore band The Blackout.

Background
In August 2008, vocalist Sean Smith said the band had written six new songs, and were aiming to record a new album later in the year. They were in the process of discussing with a few labels. Following this, the group went on a UK tour in September and October, with a handful of Christmas shows in December. They recorded at Sonic Ranch Studios in Alameda, Texas with producer Jason Perry; he and Mike Morgan served as engineers. John Mitchell mixed the album at Outhouse Studios in Reading, UK. Tom Baker mastered the album at Precisions Masters in Los Angeles, California.

Composition
The title for the song "I Love Myself And I Wanna Live" is a play on the title of the Nirvana song "I Hate Myself and Want to Die".
The song "Save Our Selves" came about the Blackout had an untitled song for the  untitled new album in 2008. They were not happy with the way it sounded, but Producer Jason Perry thought it resembled a song of his own, which he had written with friend and former bandmate Dan P Carter, and was initially given to the band "Area" that they were both working with, it was titled "Robot". Both song ideas were put together to produce "Save Our Selves (The Warning)", which ended up being the band's most commercial single from the album.

Release
On 24 February 2009, it was announced that the band had signed to independent label Epitaph Records. Smith said they picked this label as they "love[d] their ethics", as well as being fans of albums Epitaph had released. "ShutTheFuckUppercut" was first played on BBC Radio 1, where it was announced it would be released as a free download in April. This free download was actually offered for less than a week from 26 March but was released as a digital single from 30 March. "Children of the Night" was the album's lead single, and was played for the first time on Radio 1 on 13 April 2009. The music video was released on Wednesday 15 April on MTV's website. The studio recording features vocals from the Year 6 class of Herolgerrig Primary School, Merthyr Tydfil, where the band is from. In late April, the group performed at Give it a Name festival. In May, the group went on a headlining UK tour. The Best in Town was released on 25 May in Europe and 23 June in the US.  The track listing for the entire album was released by the band via their Myspace blog.

On 27 May, a music video was released for "Children of the Night". Following this, the band headlined the Slam Dunk Festival, and appeared at the Download Festival. The band performed on the Kevin Says stage at Warped Tour, before headlining the Festival Republic Stage at the Reading and Leeds Festivals. The video for "This Is Why We Can't Have Nice Things (I Don't Care)" was recorded at the Islington O2 Academy on 5 September. The video features Josh Franceschi of You Me at Six, as well as members of Kids in Glass Houses and Young Guns. The video was posted online on 16 November. In January and February 2010, the band supported All Time Low on the Kerrang! tour. They played at Download Festival in June, before headlining the Rock Sound Cave stage at GuilFest in July. In December, the band supported You Me at Six on their headlining UK tour.

"Save Ourselves (The Warning)" was nominated at the Kerrang! Awards for Best Single, but lost to "Liquid Confidence" by You Me at Six. In January 2014, the group performed the album in its entirety for a one-off performance.

Track listing 
Track listing per sleeve.

"Shut-the-Fuck-Uppercut" - 3:14
"Save Our Selves (The Warning)" - 3:35
"Top of the World" - 3:28
"The Fire" - 3:31
"Children of the Night" - 2:57
"Said and Done" - 3:22
"Silent When We Speak" - 4:13
"I Love Myself and I Wanna Live" - 3:14
"This Is Why We Can't Have Nice Things" (featuring Josh Franceschi of You Me at Six) - 3:33
"We're Going to Hell... So Bring the Sunblock" - 3:10

Personnel
Personnel per booklet.

The Blackout
 Sean Smith – vocals
 Gavin Butler – vocals
 James Davies – guitar
 Matthew Davies – guitar
 Rhys Lewis – bass
 Gareth Lawrence – drums

Additional musicians
 Josh Franceschi – additional vocals (track 9)
 Year 6 Heolgerrig Primary School – additional vocals (track 5)

Production and design
 Jason Perry – producer, engineer, mixing
 Mike Morgan – engineer
 John Mitchell – mixing
 Tom Baker – mastering
 Adam Fisher – artwork, layout

References

External links

The Best in Town at YouTube (streamed copy where licensed)

2009 albums
The Blackout (band) albums
Epitaph Records albums
Albums produced by Jason Perry
Albums recorded at Sonic Ranch